{{DISPLAYTITLE:C6H6O5}}
The molecular formula C6H6O5 may refer to:

 Maleylacetic acid, a chemical compound produced in the biodegradation of catechin by Bradyrhizobium japonicum
 Pentahydroxybenzene, a chemical compound whose structure consists of a benzene ring with five hydroxy groups (–OH) as substituents